John 8 is the eighth chapter in the Gospel of John in the New Testament of the Christian Bible. It continues the account of Jesus' debate with the Pharisees after the Feast of Tabernacles, which began in the previous chapter.

Verses 1-11, along with John 7:53, form a pericope which is missing from some ancient Greek manuscripts. In verse 12, Jesus describes himself as "the light of the world" and verse 32 contains the well-known teaching "ye shall know the truth, and the truth shall make you free". In verses 56–58, Jesus claims to have pre-existed (or, according to non-Trinitarian interpretations, been foreordained ) before Abraham. "Verily, verily, I say unto you, Before Abraham was, I am".

Text
The original text was written in Koine Greek. This chapter is divided into 59 verses.

Textual witnesses
Some early manuscripts containing the text of this chapter are: 
Papyrus 75 (AD 175–225)
Papyrus 66 (c. 200).
Codex Vaticanus (325-350)
Codex Sinaiticus (330-360)
Codex Bezae (c. 400)
Codex Alexandrinus (400-440)
Codex Ephraemi Rescriptus (c. 450; extant verses 35–59)

Pericope adulterae (8:1–11)

The first eleven verses in chapter 8 are usually grouped with a previous verse, John 7:53, to form a passage known as "Pericope adulterae" or "Pericope de Adultera". It is considered canonical, but not found in some ancient Greek manuscripts of the New Testament (such as P,  P, Codex Sinaiticus, Codex Vaticanus) and some old translations).

The style of the story may be compared with Luke 7:36–50, and could be called a 'biographical apophthegm', in which a saying of Jesus may have been developed into the story of a woman caught in adultery. Here, as in the Synoptic Gospels, Jesus does not reject the law directly but criticizes those who 'apply it mechanically', for the law should be interpreted 'in the light of God's mercy for sinners'.

Narrative
At the end of the Feast of Tabernacles, Jesus goes overnight to the Mount of Olives (John 8:1), "lodging probably in the house of Lazarus", according to the Expositor's Greek Testament, whilst everyone else "goes home" (John 7:53). Jesus returns to the Temple early the next morning.

Verse 1

But Jesus went to the Mount of Olives.

Verse 7
So when they continued asking Him, He raised Himself up and said to them,
"He who is without sin among you, let him throw a stone at her first."
"He raised Himself up": or "He looked up" 
John 8.] Accessed July 9, 2019.</ref>

Verse 11She said, "No one, Lord."And Jesus said to her, "Neither do I condemn you; go and sin no more.""Go and": after these words, NU and M versions have "from now on".

Authenticity
There is dispute over the authenticity of the passage. It appears in the King James Version but modern English translations note that it is not present in the 'most reliable early manuscripts' of John, and therefore suggest that it is unlikely to have been part of the original text. H. W. Watkins notes that the Jewish "scribes" (verse 3) and not referred to elsewhere in this Gospel. Until recently, it was not thought that any Greek Church Father had taken note of the passage before the 12th century; but in 1941 a large collection of the writings of Didymus the Blind (ca. 313–398) was discovered in Egypt, including a reference to the pericope adulterae (in Didymus' commentary on Ecclesiastes:) as being found in "several copies", and it is now considered established that this passage was present in its usual place in some Greek manuscripts known in Alexandria and elsewhere from the 4th century onwards. In support of this it is noted that the 4th-century Codex Vaticanus, which was written in Egypt, marks the end of John chapter 7 with an umlaut, indicating that an alternative reading was known at this point.

Jerome reports that the pericope adulterae was to be found in its usual place in "many Greek and Latin manuscripts" in Rome and the Latin West in the late 4th century. This is confirmed by some Latin Fathers of the 4th and 5th centuries CE, including Ambrose and Augustine. The latter claimed that the passage may have been improperly excluded from some manuscripts in order to avoid the impression that Christ had sanctioned adultery:
Certain persons of little faith, or rather enemies of the true faith, fearing, I suppose, lest their wives should be given impunity in sinning, removed from their manuscripts the Lord's act of forgiveness toward the adulteress, as if he who had said, Sin no more, had granted permission to sin.

Papias (circa AD 125) refers to a story of Jesus and a woman "accused of many sins" as being found in the Gospel of the Hebrews, which may refer to this passage (as cited in Eusebius, H.E 3.39.17). There is a very certain quotation of the pericope adulterae in the 3rd-century Syriac Didascalia Apostolorum 8.2, though without indicating John's Gospel. The Constitutions of the Holy Apostles Book II.24 refers to the passage "And when the elders had set another woman who had sinned before Him, and had left the sentence to Him, and were gone out, our Lord, the Searcher of the hearts, inquiring of her whether the elders had condemned her, and being answered No, He said unto her: 'Go thy way therefore, for neither do I condemn thee. Book II is generally dated to the late third century (Von Drey, Krabbe, Bunsen, Funk). Codex Fuldensis, which is positively dated to AD 546 contains the adulterae pericope. The Second Epistle of Pope Callistus section 6 contains a quote that may be from : "Let him see to it that he sin no more, that the sentence of the Gospel may abide in him: 'Go, and sin no more. However the epistle quotes from eighth-century writings and is not thought to be genuine.

Almost all modern translations now include the Pericope de Adultera at John 7:53-8:11, but some enclose it in brackets or add a note concerning the oldest and most reliable witnesses.

Jesus the Light of the World (8:12–30)
Verse 12Then Jesus spoke to them again, saying,:"I am the light of the world.He who follows Me shall not walk in darkness, but have the light of life." 
Jesus describes himself as "the Light of the World", revisiting a theme of the Prologue to the Gospel:The light shines in the darkness, and the darkness did not comprehend it. (John 1:5 NKJV)

Jesus' statement is discontinuous both with the narrative of John 7:53–8:11, everyone but the woman having left the Temple convicted by their own consciences, and with the preceding verse, John 7:52, where Nicodemus the Pharisee had been urged by the other members of the Sanhedrin to re-examine the scriptures on the issue of whether a prophet could come from Galilee. Theologian Heinrich Meyer attempts to find a connection:
We must look for some connection with John 7:52. This may be found simply as follows. As the  had not been able to carry out their design of apprehending Jesus, and had, moreover, become divided among themselves (as is recorded in ), He was able, in consequence of this miscarriage in their plans against Him, to come forth afresh and address the assembled people in the temple.

Verse 13The Pharisees therefore said to Him, "You bear witness of Yourself; Your witness is not true".The Pharisees complain that Jesus bears witness to himself, an issue also addressed in the Prologue:
John the Baptist came for a witness, to bear witness of the Light, that all through him might believe. He was not that Light, but was sent to bear witness of that Light. That was the true Light which gives light to every man coming into the world. (John 1:7-8: NKJV)
The assertion being made is not that Jesus' statement is untrue, but that it is not valid as testimony, insufficient, or "cannot be verified".

Verse 14Jesus answered and said to them, "Even if I bear witness of Myself, My witness is true, for I know where I came from and where I am going; but you do not know where I come from and where I am going".
, (egō marturō peri emautou): the expressed ἐγώ indicates that Jesus is an exception to the rule, the reason being that "He knows whence He comes and whither He goes ... He knows His origin and His destiny. He knows Himself, and therefore the rule mentioned has no application to Him."

Jesus' dialogue with the Jews who had believed in Him (8:31–59)
After stating that many of Jesus' hearers believed in him, the narrative moves Jesus' dialogue from the Pharisees to the Jews who had believed in him (verse 31). Many English translations have "Jews who believed in Him"  identifies a contrast and "perhaps, something of wonder" in the idea that there were Jews who were believers. The tone of verses 31 to 59 is critical and argumentative with this group; the Pulpit Commentary finds them to be believers of "the most imperfect kind", who "accepted the Messianic claims [of Jesus], but persisted in interpreting them, not by his word, but by their own ideas of the theocratic kingdom, by their privileges as children of Abraham, by their national animosity to their nearest neighbours the Samaritans, by their inability to press behind the veil of his humanity to his Divine nature".

American theologian J. Louis Martyn suggested that John's Gospel could be read on two levels, portraying events and contesting controversies in the early church through a narrative portraying the life and teaching of Jesus. Such a reading suggests a controversy regarding Jewish partial-believers in Jesus as the Messiah who, according to the evangelist, did not accept the whole "truth" of orthodox Christian teaching and maintained that their covenantal relationship with God was rooted in the Abrahamic tradition rather than the salvation (freedom) offered by Jesus. For this group of Jews, the fundamental credal proposition was that "Abraham is our father" (a). Instead, "you seek to kill Me, a Man who has told you the truth which I heard from God". The Pulpit Commentary notes this phrase as "the only place [in the gospels] where the Lord speaks of himself as 'a man, although the threat to kill "a man" can also be read as indicating that the Jews threatened to kill those proclaiming the message which the evangelist identifies as the true gospel.

In , Jesus is accused of being a Samaritan and being demon-possessed. He denies having a demon, but makes no comment on the Samaritan accusation. The controversy portrayed as Jesus arguing with "the Jews who had believed in Him" continues through to verse 59. Jesus states that the current times fulfil Abraham's hopes and that Abraham saw this time and "was glad". The evangelist brings the chapter to its climax with Jesus' words, "before Abraham was, I AM", words which inevitably are interpreted as Jesus "[taking] to Himself the Divine Name" and so they "prepare to stone Him for blasphemy". The evangelist ends the narrative with a verse in which Jesus evades their violent response and leaves the Temple. Some manuscripts add Jesus "going through the midst of them, and so passed by". No English Version previous to the one of 1611 contains the passage".

See also
Abraham
Light of the World
Veritas vos liberabit
Related Bible parts: Ezekiel 33, Matthew 3

Notes

References

Sources

External links
 King James Bible - Wikisource
English Translation with Parallel Latin Vulgate
Online Bible at GospelHall.org (ESV, KJV, Darby, American Standard Version, Bible in Basic English)
Multiple bible versions at Bible Gateway (NKJV, NIV, NRSV etc.)

John 08